
Przemyśl County is a unit of territorial administration and local government (powiat) in Subcarpathian Voivodeship, south-eastern Poland, on the border with Ukraine. It came into being on January 1, 1999, as a result of the Polish local government reforms passed in 1998. Its administrative seat is the city of Przemyśl, although the city is not part of the county (it constitutes a separate city county).

As of 2019 its total population is 74,234.

Neighbouring counties
Apart from the city of Przemyśl, Przemyśl County is also bordered by Bieszczady County to the south, Lesko County to the south-west, Sanok County, Brzozów County and Rzeszów County to the west, and Przeworsk County and Jarosław County to the north. It also borders Ukraine to the east.

Administrative division
The county is subdivided into 10 gminas. These are listed in the following table, in descending order of population.

Rural landscape picture

References

 
Land counties of Podkarpackie Voivodeship